Blokdijk is a hamlet in the municipality of Drechterland, in the Dutch province of North Holland. Until 2006, Blokdijk was part of the municipality Venhuizen.

Both Blokdijk and De Hout are formally a part of Wijdenes. Blokdijk arose at the dyke from Hoorn to Venhuizen. It was first mentioned in 1402 as Block-dyck, and means "enclosed pasture near a dike". Blokdijk does not have place name signs.

Gallery

References 

Populated places in North Holland
Drechterland